The zhonghu, short for zhongyin erhu is a low-pitched Chinese bowed string instrument. Together with the erhu and gaohu, it is a member of the huqin family. It was developed in the 1940s as the alto member of the huqin family (similar in range to the European viola) to increase the pitch range of the instruments used in a Chinese orchestra.

The zhonghu is analogous with the erhu, but is slightly larger and lower pitched. Its body is covered on the playing end with snakeskin. The instrument has two strings, which are generally tuned to the interval of a fifth, to A and E or to G and D (this latter tuning equivalent to the violin's lowest two strings).

Presence in popular music 
Composer Jeremy Zuckerman has used the Zhonghu in critically acclaimed shows' music such as Avatar: The Last Airbender and The Legend of Korra. Specifically, he has said in the podcast Song Exploder that along with the Erhu, the Zhonghu was used in The Legend of Korra's series finale music.

See also 
 Huqin
 Music of China
 String instruments
 Traditional Chinese musical instruments

References

External links 
 Video of Xiaohui Ma playing zhonghu (click "Video: Ma Xiaohui Tells the Story of Her Erhu" to watch)

Chinese musical instruments
Drumhead lutes
Huqin family instruments
Necked bowl lutes